Richard Bishop (March 23, 1950 – September 26, 2016) was an American football defensive tackle who played for the New England Patriots. He played college football at Marshalltown Community College in Marshalltown, Iowa where he was a First-team NJCAA All-American as a defensive end. Following his career at Marshalltown, Bishop played for the University of Louisville. He died in Miami, Florida, in 2016.

Richard recorded 30.5 sacks, recovered 6 fumbles and blocked a field goal attempt while playing on the defensive line for the New England Patriots over the 1976–81 seasons in the National Football League. He was a member of the New England Patriots 1980s All-Decade Team.  He shared in a sack of Ken Stabler and Dan Manucci, recorded 1 sack of Mike Rae, Ron Jaworski, Ken Anderson, Scott Hunter, Greg Landry, Matt Robinson, Marc Wilson, David Woodley and  sacks of Dan Fouts. He had 2 sacks of Joe Ferguson and Jack Thompson and 3 sacks of Pro Football Hall of Famer Bob Griese.  Recorded 5 sacks of Bert Jones and 8 sacks of Jets QB Richard Todd.  Richard recovered fumbles by Terry Bradshaw, Mike Hogan, John Riggins, Joe Washington and Richard Todd.  He blocked a 40-yard field goal attempt by Mark Moseley in the Patriots 24–22 loss to the Washington Redskins on 10-25-81.  He recorded one safety when he sacked Bob Griese in the Patriots 33–24 win over Miami on 10-22-78.  Richard participated in 3 sacks of Dan Pastorini in the Patriots 31-14 Divisional Playoff Game loss to Houston on 12-31-78.

References

1950 births
2016 deaths
Players of American football from Cleveland
American football defensive linemen
Canadian football defensive linemen
Louisville Cardinals football players
New England Patriots players
Miami Dolphins players
Los Angeles Rams players
Hamilton Tiger-Cats players
Ottawa Rough Riders players